USS Davis (DD-65) was a  destroyer in the United States Navy during World War I. She was the second Navy ship named for Rear Admiral Charles Henry Davis (1807–1877). She served with the United States Coast Guard as (CG-21).

Construction and commissioning
Davis was launched 15 August 1916 by Bath Iron Works, Bath, Maine, sponsored by Miss E. Davis, granddaughter of Admiral Davis; and commissioned 5 October 1916.

Service history

World War I
Assigned to Destroyer Force, Atlantic Fleet, Davis operated on the east coast and in the Caribbean until the United States entered World War I. She sailed from Boston 24 April 1917 as one of six destroyers in the first American destroyer detachment to reach European waters, arriving at Queenstown, Ireland, 4 May. She performed patrol duty off the coast of Ireland and escorted merchant convoys through the zone of greatest danger from submarines. Between 25 and 28 June she met and escorted troop transports carrying the first American Expeditionary Force to France. On 13 December 1918 she formed part of the escort force to take , with President Woodrow Wilson embarked, into the harbor at Brest, France, then passed in review before the President.

United States Coast Guard
Davis returned to New York 7 January 1919 and after an overhaul there joined Division 4, Flotilla 8, Destroyer Force, Atlantic Fleet, to cruise on the east coast.

From September 1919 to November 1920 she was in reserve at Philadelphia Navy Yard. Arriving at Charleston, South Carolina, 3 December 1920, she operated from that port and Newport in reduced commission until arriving at Philadelphia Navy Yard 29 March 1922.

She was decommissioned there 20 June 1922 and transferred to the Coast Guard 25 March 1926. Homeported in New London, Connecticut, she served as part of the Rum Patrol.

Davis returned to the Navy on 30 June 1933. She was retained in a decommissioned status until sold 22 August 1934.

References

External links
Tin Can Sailors.com USS Davis (DD-65) history

 

Sampson-class destroyers
Ships built in Bath, Maine
World War I destroyers of the United States
1916 ships